Begoña Maestre (Baracaldo, August 1, 1978) is a Spanish actress. She has worked in television, film and theater. She stands out among other things for her participation in the series Amar en tiempos revueltos and Hospital Central.

Biography 
Begoña has worked in all media, both in theater, television and cinema. As for theater, we have been able to see her on stage, playing different characters in plays such as Cyrano de Bergerac, Mujeres frente al espejo, Ana en el trópico, Kyrie, el nuevo europeo or Schubert.

As for cinema, her debut was in 2003 with the short film Leni, by Luis García Gómez, in which Begoña played the main character, Leni.

The following year, under the orders of Antonio Gárate, she shot the feature film Un año en la luna, in which she played the character of Esther, followed in 2006 by Alesio, directed by Gustavo Jiménez.

Other films in her filmography are Cuestión de química, by Juan Moya, or Soy el solitario, where she plays Silvia Pereira. In 2011 she worked in the film Arriya, by Alberto Gorritiberea. The last film in which she has participated was the film of director Benito Zambrano, in 201, La voz dormida, based on a novel by Dulce Chacón and dealing with Franco's repression during the post-war period.

On the small screen is where the actress has become better known. She has intervened occasionally, in single episodes, in some of the most successful series of our television, such as Paco y Veva, Hospital Central and El comisario, intervening in the latter series in 4 episodes.

She has also had fixed characters in several series, being part of the team of the same. Thus, in 2001 she worked in Ciudad-Sur, in the role of Isa, and in 2001 she joined the series Compañeros, in which she was Duna Belarde. In 2004 she also worked in the thriller series Motivos personales, playing the character of Tania Acosta.

In 2006 she was hired to act in the soap opera Amar en tiempos revueltos, where she gained great popularity with her role as Carlota Domínguez, the mystical and puritanical sister of Elisa.

In 2009 she joined the team of the series Hospital Central where she had already participated in an episode, but now with a fixed character, Raquel Castaño. In 2014 she joined the cast of Chiringuito de Pepe. Between 2019 and 2020 she is part of the series Mercado Central of TVE playing Celia Mendoza, a widowed and enterprising mother.

Filmography

Television

Cinema 

 Leni (2003), by Luis García Gómez (cortometraje). As Leni.
 Un año en la luna (2004), by Antonio Gárate. As Esther.
 Alesio (2006), by Gustavo Jiménez.
 Cuestión de química (2007) by Juan Moya.
 Soy el solitario (2008). As Silvia Pereira
 Arriya (2011) by  Alberto Gorritiberea.
 La voz dormida (2011) by Benito Zambrano as Amalia.

Theater 

 Schubert.
 Kyrie, el nuevo europeo.
 Ana en el trópico.
 Mujeres frente al espejo.
 Cyrano de Bergerac.
 La gata sobre el tejado de zinc (2017)

References

External links 
 Begoña Maestre on IMDb

Spanish television actresses
1978 births
Living people